Amebelodontidae is an extinct family of large herbivorous mammals that were closely related to elephants. They were formerly assigned to Gomphotheriidae, but recent authors consider them a distinct family.

Feeding habits
In the past, Amebelodonts' shovel-like mandibular tusks led to them being portrayed scooping up water plants. However, the wear pattern on the mandibular tusks of Platybelodon grangeri and P. barnumbrowni indicate that these taxa used their tusks to cut through vegetation in a specialized way.

Gallery

References

 
Prehistoric mammal families
Miocene first appearances
Pliocene extinctions